The 19th Golden Raspberry Awards were held on March 20, 1999, at the Huntley Hotel Garden Room in Santa Monica, California, to recognize the worst movie industry had to offer in 1998.

Awards and nominations

Films with multiple nominations 
These films received multiple nominations:

See also

 1998 in film
 71st Academy Awards
 52nd British Academy Film Awards
 56th Golden Globe Awards
 5th Screen Actors Guild Awards

References

Golden Raspberry Awards
Golden Raspberry Awards ceremonies
1999 in American cinema
1999 in California
March 1999 events in the United States
Golden Raspberry